Scopula simplificata is a moth of the  family Geometridae. It is found in Ethiopia.

References

Endemic fauna of Ethiopia
Moths described in 1928
simplificata
Insects of Ethiopia
Moths of Africa